Jingdong is a town in Qingshanhu District, Nanchang, Jiangxi province, China. , it administers the following sixteen residential communities and ten villages:
Jingdong Xiaoqu Community
Nanyang Huayuan Community
Qingchun Jiayuan Community
Yilanyuan Community
Jiayuan Community
Aixihuxi Community
Jingze Community
Jing'an Community
Chengdong Huayuan Community
Nanfang Community
Donghua Institute of Metrology Community
Jinghua Community
Jingrong Community
Tielujiucun First Community
Tielujiucun Second Community
Tianxiang Community
Liangwan Village
Taosheng Village
Taohu Village
Gaoxing Village
Tangnan Village
Hexing Village
Taozhu Village
Huangcheng Village
Liansheng Village
Yuefang Village

References

Township-level divisions of Jiangxi
Nanchang